Patrick Gregory Terrion (May 2, 1960 – September 28, 2018) was a Canadian professional ice hockey player who played 561 games in the National Hockey League (NHL). His jersey number was 7 and he played for the Toronto Maple Leafs and the Los Angeles Kings.

Terrion was originally drafted by Los Angeles in the second round in the 1980 NHL Entry Draft, and played two seasons for the club before a trade on October 19, 1982 sent him to the Maple Leafs in exchange for a fourth round draft pick in 1983. He played six seasons for Toronto. He died of a heart attack at the age of 58 on September 28, 2018.

Career statistics

References

External links

1960 births
2018 deaths
Brantford Alexanders players
Canadian ice hockey centres
Canadian ice hockey left wingers
Hamilton Fincups players
Ice hockey people from Ontario
New Haven Nighthawks players
Newmarket Saints players
Los Angeles Kings draft picks
Los Angeles Kings players
People from Hastings County
Toronto Maple Leafs players